Richard Dudgeon (1819, Tain – 9 April 1895, New York City) was a mechanic, noted for his inventions of the hydraulic jack and steam carriage. Born in Scotland, he emigrated as a boy with his family to the United States, where he became a mechanic in New York.  He founded an engineering machine shop on Broome Street and this prospered, so that he was able to live well nearby and have a country estate in Harlem.  The business still exists as Richard Dudgeon, Inc.

References

1819 births
1895 deaths
American civil engineers
Hydraulic engineers
Scottish emigrants to the United States
People from Ross and Cromarty
19th-century American engineers
19th-century American inventors